Nicolas Seube (born 11 August 1979) is a French former professional footballer who played as a midfielder.

Career
Born in Toulouse, Seube began his football career for Toulouse FC but never played in its first team. In 2001, he was transferred to Stade Malherbe Caen, where he played firstly as a fullback. From the 2008–09 season, he preferred to play as a defensive midfielder.

He spent his whole career with Stade Malherbe Caen, scoring 10 goals in 424 appearances (6 goals in 179 in Ligue 1) between 2001 and 2015. He was promoted in Ligue 1 with his club in 2004, 2007, 2010, and 2014. He captained the club from 2006 to 2012.

In 2013, he surpassed Anthony Deroin's record of appearances for Caen and became the club's all-time leader in appearances.

He retired in 2017.

See also
List of one-club men

References

External links

1979 births
Living people
Footballers from Toulouse
French footballers
Association football defenders
Toulouse FC players
Stade Malherbe Caen players
Ligue 1 players
Ligue 2 players